Abigail Jane Hunter (1855–November 1918), was as an early pioneer businesswoman, real estate developer, and visionary of Carmel-by-the-Sea. In 1889, she worked with Santiago James Duckworth (1862-1930) to help build a Catholic summer resort called Carmel City. After an unsuccessful undertaking, she sold her holdings to Dr. Walton Saunders in 1900. Hunter was the first one to promote Carmel City in newspaper advertisements and post card mailers as Carmel-by-the-Sea.

Early life 

Hunter was born Abigail Jane Goldsmith in San Francisco, California, in 1855. She was the daughter of Jonathan Gillet Goldsmith (1812-1886) and Annie Johnston (1820-1898). The family left New Orleans and moved to San Francisco in 1849. Abigail became a music teacher and organist. She married John J. Hunter on September 6, 1876 in San Francisco, and lived on 355 First Street. They had one child, Wesley Rutherford Hunter (1876-1966), who was bom on February 12, 1876, at San Francisco’s Hunter’s Point, which was named for his father. The Hunters were divorced on September 4, 1903, in San Francisco.

Professional background

Carmel City

In early 1888, the Pacific Improvement Company wanted to extend the Pacific railroad from Monterey to the Carmel River. Real estate developer Santiago J. Duckworth wanted to use this railway to establish a Catholic retreat near the Carmel Mission, in what would be called "Carmel City." However, the railroad was only extended from Monterey to the Asilimar in Pacific Grove, California. On February 18, 1888, Duckworth signed an agreement with French businessman and Monterey businessman Honoré Escolle, to sell  to Duckworth and his brother the property to build a Catholic Community. The land began at the top of the Carmel Hill and ran past Hatton Ranch, down through Ocean Avenue to Junipero Avenue.

In March 1888, Duckworth authorized W. C. Little, of Monterey, to survey the Carmel property and provide a subdivision map of the townsite with 135 blocks divided into four tracks. In July 1888, Duckworth began selling lots. In April 1889, Duckworth placed an announcement in the local newspapers for the sale of lots, highlighting the advantages and proximity to the Southern Pacific Railroad.

Real estate developer Abbie Jane Hunter’s uncle, carpenter Delos Edward Goldsmith (1828-1923) from Ohio, moved to Carmel in late 1888. Goldsmith and Hunter, with her son Wesley Hunter, started buying lots and building their first homes. In 1892 and 1894, Goldsmith built two Queen Anne-style cottages, and erected a home for his niece and her son.

In December 1889, Abbie Hunter bought 7 lots in Carmel City from Duckworth. Her uncle Goldsmith purchased 5 lots in March 1890. In 1889, Duckworth set aside 5 lots on Broadway Avenue (now Junipero), between 6th Avenue and Ocean Avenue, for Carmel City's first 18-room Hotel Carmelo. Hunter built the hotel with the help of Goldsmith and her son, Wesley Hunter. The Hotel Carmelo was purchased by the Carmel Development Company in April 1903 and dismantled. It was then moved down Ocean Avenue to Monte Verde Street where it became the shell for the present Pine Inn.

In 1889, Hunter was responsible for getting the Carmel community bathhouse at the end of Ocean Avenue at the Carmel beach built with the help of Goldsmith and Wesley Hunter. The bathhouse was built to attracts tourists and had a boardwalk running from the main door to the beach with a cupola and windows across the front to view the ocean. It was torn down in 1929.

In December 1889, Duckworth sold another 207 lots. Most of the people that bought the lots were school teachers and administrators from San Francisco.

In 1890, Duckworth printed a subdivision map, showing a 18-room Hotel Carmelo, cottages, and lots for sale.

Women's Investment Company 

In May 1891, Hunter formed the Women's Real Investment Company in San Francisco, what would become Carmel's first development group. She was appointed President of the Investment Company on August 16, 1891. The company headquarters were in the California Academy of Sciences building.

In July 1891, Hunter promoted lots in Carmel that could be purchased through her Investment Company for $100 to $300. Duckworth advertised lots from $50 to $100 through his Duckworth Bros. Co., in Monterey. On November 17, 1892, Duckworth decided to go into politics and directed all of his unsold lots to Escolle as his agent.

Hunter, of 355 First Street, was arrested in February 1892, when Duckworth brought charges of embezzlement. Duckworth said that Hunter was collecting money for her own use on property sold on the installment plan and that she had formed a conspiracy against Duckworth. It was also said that she transferred all her property to her mother, Annie Goldsmith. Hunter won the civil action and was able to show that Duckworth actually owed her money.

In February 1895, Hunter was apprehended and arrested in San Francisco on a charge of obtaining money by false pretenses and failing to produce a deed to a client, Mary O'Donnell, who had bought a lot in the Sunnyside tract of San Francisco. Hunter was released on $3000 bail. The San Francisco court drop the charges, but the bank foreclosed on her home in Carmel-by-the-Sea on Guadalupe Street and 4th Avenue.

Carmel-by-the-Sea

In July 1892, Hunter's Women's Real Investment Company became the active developer and acquired 164 acres of the Carmel City tract through its investors. In 1892, Hunter sent out a bulk mailing postcard promoting Carmel-by-the-Sea instead of a Catholic retreat:

References to Carmel City as a Catholic resort were never used again. William T. Dummage was sent to Carmel as the resident agent in 1892, to sell lots for Hunter. Dummage and his wife went on to build the Mary Dummage Shop. On August 16, 1891, Hunter's agents, Dummage and Goldsmith, managed to sell 300 lots, mainly to teachers, professors, and writers. Escolle continued to sell lots, but without a unified development plan, sales were slow. In addition, during the Panic of 1893 the United States went into a five-year depression that began in 1893 and ended in 1897. Sales were stagnant and the Carmel project was losing money.

The Abbie Jane Hunter House is a historic Queen Anne residence located in Carmel-by-the-Sea. The house was built in 1894 by Delos E. Goldsmith and is named after Hunter. The house is a small, rustic cottage that is characteristic of the early cottages that were built in Carmel. The house was originally built as a summer residence for Hunter. She used the cottage as a studio and as a place to entertain fellow artists and friends. Today, the house is a private residence and is not open to the public. However, its historical and architectural features make it a popular destination for architecture enthusiasts and history buffs visiting the area.

From 1895 to 1899, the business of selling lots did not improve. On April 27, 1895, before Escolle died (in December 1895), he and his wife sold a large share of land he owned in the Carmel City development to Dr. Walton Saunders.

By 1900, Hunter's Carmel enterprise was almost bankrupt. This made Saunders the owner of most of the Carmel property.

In 1900, Saunders was involved in the Fort Miller Power Company and sold his Carmel property to San Francisco attorney Frank Hubbard Powers in November 1900. In 1902, real estate developer James Franklin Devendorf became Powers's partner. They establish the Carmel Development Company on November 25, 1902, which laid the foundation to establish an artists and writers' colony that became Carmel-by-the-Sea in 1903.

In 1905, Hunter helped organize the Carmel Arts and Crafts Club with several other ladies involved in the club.

In 1910, Hunter rented a house in Oakland, California with her uncle Delos Goldsmith and two other boarders.

Death
Hunter died in November 1918 at the age of 63.

See also
 Timeline of Carmel-by-the-Sea, California

References

External links

 The Carmel Monterey Peninsula Art Colony: A History

1855 births
1918 deaths
People from Carmel-by-the-Sea, California
People from Monterey, California